In 2012 elections for both houses of the United States Congress will take place:

United States House of Representatives elections, 2012
United States Senate elections, 2012